James E. Allison (born May 13, 1975) is a Canadian former professional ice hockey defenceman. He played for the Calgary Flames. Chicago Blackhawks, Ottawa Senators, Columbus Blue Jackets, Nashville Predators and Florida Panthers of the National Hockey League.

Playing career

Junior
Allison was drafted 7th overall in the 1991 OHL Priority Draft by the Windsor Spitfires of the Ontario Hockey League.  After his rookie season, he was traded to the Detroit Junior Red Wings.  He was named team captain for the 1994-95 OHL season and helped lead the team to the win the J. Ross Robertson Cup as OHL Champions.  They advanced to the 1995 Memorial Cup final, where they lost to the Kamloops Blazers.

Professional
He was drafted by the Calgary Flames 44th overall in the 1993 NHL Entry Draft. He made his NHL debut with the Calgary Flames in the 1994–95 season. He has since played for Chicago, Columbus, Nashville, and Florida in the NHL.

On December 13, 2005, goaltender Chris Mason was injured during the pre-game warmups, resulting in the Predators having no backup goaltender.  As he was scheduled to be a healthy scratch that game, Allison was dressed the backup goaltender, instead.

In 2006, he was signed by the Ottawa Senators as a free agent and played his final season with the Senators' American Hockey League (AHL) affiliate Binghamton Senators. He played in 11 seasons in the NHL, appearing in 372 games, with 7 goals and 23 assists, as well as 639 penalty minutes.

Post-Retirement
In 2007, he was named an assistant coach for the Brampton Battalion of the OHL.

Regular season and playoffs

References

External links

1975 births
Living people
Binghamton Senators players
Canadian ice hockey defencemen
Calgary Flames draft picks
Calgary Flames players
Chicago Blackhawks players
Columbus Blue Jackets players
Detroit Junior Red Wings players
Florida Panthers players
Ice hockey people from Ontario
Indianapolis Ice players
Nashville Predators players
Sportspeople from Kawartha Lakes
Saint John Flames players
Windsor Spitfires players